The Service de police de l'agglomération de Longueuil or SPAL (English: Urban agglomeration of Longueuil Police Service) is the police force for the urban agglomeration of Longueuil, Quebec. This service is divided into two territories, north and south.

Vehicles
Ford Taurus Police Interceptor 
Ford Crown Victoria (Phased Out)
Ford Explorer Police Interceptor

Sidearm
Officers are issued the Heckler & Koch HK P2000 Compact .45 ACP which replaced the Heckler & Koch USP as their standard issue sidearm. The holster of choice is a Safariland holster.

North division
The north division encompasses the cities/boroughs of:
 Boucherville
 Saint-Lambert
 Longueuil
Borough of Vieux-Longueuil

South division
The south division includes the cities/boroughs of :
 Brossard
 Saint-Bruno-de-Montarville
 Longueuil
Borough of Greenfield Park
Borough of Saint-Hubert

See also
 Service de police de la Ville de Montréal

References

External links
 Police Coat of Arms

Longueuil
Politics of Longueuil